Szendrő Oszkár (1889–1947) was a Hungarian international footballer who played as a winger. Szendrő, who was Jewish, played club football for Budapesti TC, also represented Hungarian national team at international level, earning 13 caps between 1908 and 1913, and appearing at the 1912 Summer Olympics.

Professional

Clubs
Szendrő began his football career when he signed with Budapest TC in 1905.  He was 15 at the time.

National team
Szendrő earned 13 caps with the Hungarian national team between 1908 and 1913.  In 1912, he was a member of the Hungarian Olympic Team.

References 

 Antal Zoltán – Hoffer József: Alberttől Zsákig, Budapest, Sportkiadó, 1968
 Rejtő László – Lukács László – Szepesi György: Felejthetetlen 90 percek, Budapest, Sportkiadó, 1977,

External links
 Oszkár Szendrő at playmakerstats.com (English version of leballonrond.fr)

1889 births
1947 deaths
Hungarian Jews
Jewish footballers
Hungarian footballers
Hungary international footballers
Association football defenders
Footballers from Budapest